
Gmina Granowo is a rural gmina (administrative district) in Grodzisk Wielkopolski County, Greater Poland Voivodeship, in west-central Poland.

Villages
Gmina Granowo contains the villages and settlements of Bielawy, Dalekie, Drużyn, Granówko, Granowo, Januszewice, Kotowo, Kubaczyn, Niemierzyce, Separowo, Strzępiń and Zemsko.

Neighbouring gminas
Gmina Granowo is bordered by the gminas of Buk, Grodzisk Wielkopolski, Kamieniec, Opalenica and Stęszew.

References

External links
Polish official population figures 2006

Granowo
Grodzisk Wielkopolski County